Arthur Bullock (7 October 1909 – 1997) was an English professional footballer who played as an outside forward in the Football League for Hull City and York City, and in non-League football for Bridlington Town. He was capped two times by England schools in 1924.

References

1909 births
Footballers from Kingston upon Hull
1997 deaths
English footballers
England schools international footballers
Association football forwards
Hull City A.F.C. players
York City F.C. players
Bridlington Town A.F.C. players
English Football League players
Date of death missing